Tuggeranong Parkway is an  major highway in Canberra, Australia. Often referred to as "The Parkway" by locals, Tuggeranong Parkway links Civic to the southern Canberra metro district of Tuggeranong, and is a bypass road to the Woden Valley-Weston Creek district of Canberra. It also links to the Glenloch Interchange, where roads such as Caswell Drive connect to Belconnen.

Route description
The Tuggeranong Parkway starts at Glenloch Interchange, continuing southwest from the roadway that forms Caswell Drive. After a short distance the parkway encounters its first interchange, which crosses over a spur of Lady Denman Drive. This spur provides access to the National Arboretum. The next few kilometres of roadway continue past the National Arboretum and through pine plantations while veering southwards, before crossing over the Molonglo River just to the north of the next interchange with Cotter Road. Following this interchange the parkway begins to climb Oakey Hill, crossing over Heysen Street during the ascent. After peaking high on the hill, it then begins to descend toward the Hindmarsh Drive interchange. The parkway then continues a slow descent toward its terminus at the Sulwood Drive intersection. The roadway itself continues southwards as Drakeford Drive.

History, planning and structure
Four speed cameras were installed on the road in July 2007 to enforce the  speed limit. They are at the Cotter Road and Hindmarsh Drive interchanges, monitoring both directions of traffic. The road was involved in the Canberra bushfires of 2003 in which the fires came up to the edge of the road.

In parts, space has been set aside for duplication of the road (to eight lanes) if future needs require it. An example can be seen in the dual road cuttings behind the suburb of Weston.

The Tuggeranong Parkway also connects to the Gungahlin Drive Extension, which connects to Belconnen and Gungahlin in the north. In the south, it runs onto Drakeford Drive as it enters Kambah.  Original plans for the Parkway had it continuing down the route of Kambah Pool Road and crossing the Murrumbidgee River over Red Rocks Gorge, to connect suburbs on the west side of the River.  Due to the environmental sensitivity of the Murrumbidgee River corridor, especially the Red Rocks Gorge, this plan was cancelled, along with the planned suburbs on the western side of the River.

Intersections and interchanges

See also

 Freeways in Australia
 Freeways in Canberra

References

Streets in Canberra